The assault of Ermyas Mulugeta happened late on Easter Sunday 2006, at a tram stop in Potsdam, Germany. Two men beat him so badly he was put into a coma for two weeks and since there appeared to be a racial motive to the attack, the case was taken up by the Public Prosecutor General. The assault had occurred amidst preparations for Germany to host the 2006 FIFA World Cup and therefore received international attention, which focused upon right-wing extremism. Two men were arrested, charged with racially motivated attempted murder and then had their charges dropped following a trial in June 2007.

Assault
Ermyas Mulugeta was born  in Ethiopia. He travelled to East Germany in 1988 on a scholarship and trained as an engineer, working from 2001 onwards at the Institute for Agricultural Engineering in Bornim, a suburb of Potsdam. He became a German citizen and got married, having two children. Mulugeta was attacked at a tram stop in Potsdam late on the evening of Easter Sunday, 16 April 2006. He was beaten up so badly he ended up in an artificially-induced coma for two weeks with a fractured skull. He was unable to remember what had happened, but he had called his wife and the answerphone message recorded racist abuse, so the incident was investigated as a hate crime.

The next day, local residents demonstrated in Potsdam against xenophobia and there was a general outpouring of sympathy for the victim.  The attack then received national coverage in the media and indicating how seriously the case was being taken, the Public Prosecutor General Kay Nehm took over the investigation. Some days later, two men were arrested and it was alleged that they had hit Mulugeta with a bottle, knocked him to the ground and kicked him repeatedly. One of the men had links to far-right movements and they were both charged with racially motivated attempted murder. They were flown by helicopter to the Federal Prosecutor's Office in Karlsruhe and appeared at the Federal Court of Justice.

Controversy

The apparent racial element of the attack caused national controversy and German Chancellor Angela Merkel called it a "heinous crime". In contrast, Federal Interior Minister Wolfgang Schäuble was condemned for saying that "there are also blond, blue-eyed victims of violent crime" (although he later backtracked) and the Brandenburg Interior Minister Jörg Schönbohm said "this could have happened in New York, Paris or London". Schönbohm also criticised Nehm both for taking on the investigation and for creating a media spectacle out of flying the suspects by helicopter to Karlsruhe. The Central Council of Jews in Germany responded to Schönbohm's comments by suggesting that "he desperately needs some private tutoring".

Trial
The trial began on 7 February 2007 at Potsdam Regional Court. Giving evidence, Mulugeta spoke slowly and had gaps in his memory. It was suggested that like the two men, Mulugeta had also been drunk and that he had been the one who had started the confrontation. It emerged that Mulugeta had called the two attackers "pigs". The charges against the two men were then dropped for lack of evidence on 15 June 2007. The lead judge stated "this is a classic case of the principle: when in doubt, give the accused the benefit of the doubt". The men were then re-arrested and charged again, only to be released a second time.

Aftermath
The assault took place amidst preparations for Germany to host the 2006 FIFA World Cup and therefore received international attention which focused on right-wing extremism. The Federal Office for the Protection of the Constitution (the domestic intelligence agency) confirmed that there had been an increase in reported far-right related incidents from 12,000 in 2004 up to 15,000 in 2005. An organization called the Africa Council then released a guide to no-go areas in Germany, citing concerns for the safety of football fans travelling from countries such as Anglola, Côte d'Ivoire, Ghana, Togo and Tunisia. Magdeburg police denied there were no-go areas in Germany.

In 2007, Mulugeta set up a foundation Löwenherz (Lionheart) in order to teach schoolchildren about diversity. He then completed a PhD at the University of Rostock on the theme of optimization of the washing procedure for vegetables and potatoes (Optimierung des Waschprozesses für Gemüse und Speisekartoffeln). Mulugeta stood for office in 2019 on behalf of the Pirate Party Germany, in the district of Potsdam-Mittelmark; he also stood in local council elections in Borkheide.

References

People from Potsdam
Pirate Party Germany politicians
2006 FIFA World Cup
University of Rostock alumni
2006 crimes in Germany